Lubaria is a genus of flowering plants belonging to the family Rutaceae.

Its native range is Costa Rica, Colombia and Venezuela.

Species
Species:
 Lubaria aroensis Pittier 
 Lubaria heterophylla Londoño-Ech., A.M.Trujillo & Pérez-Zab.

References

Zanthoxyloideae
Zanthoxyloideae genera